The Broken Islands are uninhabited islands in the Arctic Archipelago in Nunavut, Canada located within western Hudson Bay. The closest community is Rankin Inlet.

Islands of Hudson Bay
Uninhabited islands of Kivalliq Region